Kazi Abdul Majid was a Member of the 3rd National Assembly of Pakistan as a representative of East Pakistan.

Career
Majid was a Member of the  3rd National Assembly of Pakistan representing Rajshahi-IV. Majid was a Member of the  4th National Assembly of Pakistan representing Rajshahi-IV.

References

Pakistani MNAs 1962–1965
Pakistani MNAs 1965–1969
Living people
Year of birth missing (living people)